Together is a Christian democracy political party in Italy.

History
The party was founded on 4 October 2020 by the economist Stefano Zamagni, President of the Pontifical Academy of Social Sciences and author of a Manifesto launched in 2019. On 4 July 2021, Eleonora Mosti, Giancarlo Infante and Maurizio Cotta were elected as Secretaries of the party. For the 2022 Italian local elections, the party ran at Lucca and Gorizia, where Together won three seats in the Municipal Council, and one seat in the Genoan Municipal Council.

References

External links

2020 establishments in Italy
Political parties established in 2020
Christian democratic parties in Italy
Catholic political parties 
Pro-European political parties in Italy